Apep, also spelled Apepi or Aapep, or Apophis was the ancient Egyptian deity who embodied chaos (ı͗zft in Egyptian) and was thus the opponent of light and Ma'at (order/truth). He appears in art as a giant serpent. Apep was first mentioned in the Eighth Dynasty, and he was honored in the names of the Fourteenth Dynasty king 'Apepi and of the Greater Hyksos king Apophis.

Development

Ra was the solar deity, bringer of light, and thus the upholder of Ma'at. Apep was viewed as the greatest enemy of Ra, and thus was given the title Enemy of Ra, and also "the Lord of Chaos".

Apep was seen as a giant snake or serpent leading to such titles as Serpent from the Nile and Evil Dragon. Some elaborations said that he stretched 16 yards in length and had a head made of flint. Already on a Naqada I (c. 4000 BCE) C-ware bowl (now in Cairo) a snake was painted on the inside rim combined with other desert and aquatic animals as a possible enemy of a deity, possibly a solar deity, who is invisibly hunting in a big rowing vessel.

While in most texts Apep is described as a giant snake, he is sometimes depicted as a crocodile.

The few descriptions of Apep's origin in myth usually demonstrate that it was born after Ra, usually from his umbilical cord. But Apep was commonly believed to have existed from the beginning of time in the waters of Nu of primeval chaos.

Battles with Ra

Tales of Apep's battles against Ra were elaborated during the New Kingdom. Storytellers said that every day Apep must lie below the horizon and not persist in the mortal kingdom. This appropriately made him a part of the underworld. In some stories, Apep waited for Ra in a western mountain called Bakhu, where the sun set, and in others, Apep lurked just before dawn, in the Tenth region of the Night. The wide range of Apep's possible locations gained him the title World-Encircler. It was thought that his terrifying roar would cause the underworld to rumble. Myths sometimes say that Apep was trapped there, because he had been the previous chief god overthrown by Ra, or because he was evil and had been imprisoned.

The Coffin Texts imply that Apep used a magical gaze to overwhelm Ra and his entourage. Ra was assisted by a number of defenders who travelled with him, including Set and possibly the Eye of Ra. Apep's movements were thought to cause earthquakes, and his battles with Set may have been meant to explain the origin of thunderstorms. In one account, Ra himself defeats Apep in the form of a cat.

What few accounts there are of Apep's origin usually describe it as being born from Ra's umbilical cord.

Worship
Ra's victory each night was thought to be ensured by the prayers of the Egyptian priests and worshippers at temples. The Egyptians practiced a number of rituals and superstitions that were thought to ward off Apep, and aid Ra in continuing his journey across the sky.

In an annual rite called the Banishing of Chaos, priests would build an effigy of Apep that was thought to contain all of the evil and darkness in Egypt, and burn it to protect everyone from Apep's evil for another year.

The Egyptian priests had a detailed guide to fighting Apep, referred to as The Books of Overthrowing Apep (or the Book of Apophis, in Greek). The chapters described a gradual process of dismemberment and disposal, and include:
Spitting Upon Apep
Defiling Apep with the Left Foot
Taking a Lance to Smite Apep
Fettering Apep
Taking a Knife to Smite Apep
Putting Fire Upon Apep

In addition to stories about Ra's victories, this guide had instructions for making wax models, or small drawings, of the serpent, which would be spat on, mutilated and burnt, whilst reciting spells that would kill Apep. Fearing that even the image of Apep could give power to the demon, any rendering would always include another deity to subdue the monster.

As Apep was thought to live in the underworld, he was sometimes thought of as an Eater of Souls. Thus the dead also needed protection, so they were sometimes buried with spells that could destroy Apep. The Book of the Dead does not frequently describe occasions when Ra defeated the chaos snake explicitly called Apep. Only Book of the Dead Spells 7 and 39 can be explained as such.

Gallery

See also 
Apep (star system), triple star system that is a gamma-ray burst progenitor in the Milky Way
99942 Apophis, near Earth asteroid
Ethnoherpetology
Jörmungandr
Mehen
Ouroboros
Unut
Wadjet
Vritra
Nikko Jenkins, American criminal who motivated his series of murders by claiming that he is a worshipper of Apep
Python (mythology)
Referenced in John Langan's novel The Fisherman as Apophis, the world-girdling serpent harnessed as a source of magical potency

Notes

External links

 Apep, Water Snake-Demon of Chaos, Enemy of Ra...
 Ancient Egypt: The Mythology - Apep

Egyptian legendary creatures
Legendary serpents
Egyptian mythology
Egyptian demons
Egyptian gods
Evil gods
Chaos gods
Dragons
Mythological monsters
Night gods
Snake gods
Egyptian underworld
Amratian culture
Underworld gods
Personifications